Francis Barnes may refer to:

 Francis Barnes (philosopher) (1744–1838), English philosopher
 Francis V. Barnes, Secretary of the Pennsylvania Department of Education, 2004–2005

See also

 Frank Barnes (disambiguation)